H J "Harry" Dolman OBE (6 August 1897– November 9, 1977) was a well-known Bristol businessman, starting off as an engineer who later bought out the firm he worked for, Brecknell, Dolman & Rogers Ltd. (formerly Brecknell, Munro & Rogers Ltd.) and as chairman and president of Bristol City FC.

Early life
Harry Dolman was born in Kington Langley near Chippenham, Wiltshire.  His father was by trade a farmer and also landlord of a village pub.

Brecknell, Dolman & Rogers Ltd.
Starting out as a 21-year-old junior draughtsman in the engineering firm within six years Dolman had become chief engineer and by 1929, managing director. The company's products ranged from egg grading machines to ticket and change issuing machines, many of them Dolman's own inventions, the company was also credited with making turnstiles for the London Underground. At its height the business employed 1,600 people. The scope of its original purely mechanical machines was expanded considerably when in the 1960s BDR acquired the Brislington-based electronics company Redcliffe Electronics which was renamed Brecknell-Redcliffe Electronics which continued in the development of electronically actuated ticket and coin machines, obtaining a number of patents in this field

The firm then known in 1969 as BDR Machines (or with affection in Bristol as Dolman's) was sold to the Vokes Group and in turn was taken over by Thomas Tilling in 1972. A year later in spite of protests by the employees and trade unions, the decision was taken by Tilling Group, to abandon the business altogether.

Association with Bristol City FC
Harry Dolman was chairman of Bristol City FC between 1949 and 1974, he designed the first set of floodlights installed at Ashton Gate stadium in the early 1950s and was fundamental in the design and build of the Dolman Stand which opened in 1970 at the cost of £235,000.

In 1974 having been deposed as chairman, he took on the presidency which he held until his death in 1977, aged 80. His wife, Marina, now holds this position.

References

External links
 http://www.bcfc.co.uk Bristol City Football Club's official website

1897 births
1977 deaths
20th-century English businesspeople
Bristol City F.C.
English football chairmen and investors
Businesspeople from Bristol